Mells is a hamlet in the English county of  Suffolk.

It is on the southern bank of the River Blyth across the river by bridge from Holton; it forms part of Wenhaston with Mells Hamlet civil parish that, in turn, forms part of East Suffolk district.

The place-name 'Mells' is first attested in the Domesday Book of 1086, where it appears as Mealla. The name simply means 'mills', from the Old English 'mylen'.

References

Hamlets in Suffolk
Suffolk Coastal